Ponghwa Station is a station on the Chŏllima Line and the Man'gyŏngdae Line of the Pyongyang Metro. Both lines are operated as a single continuous service, hence all trains from either line runs through to the other line at the station. Some Chŏllima Line trains formerly short turned at the station.

The station consists of a single storey building with a large clock above the station entrance.

Nearby
 Pyongyang Medical University

References

External links
 

Pyongyang Metro stations
Railway stations opened in 1973
1973 establishments in North Korea